Christopher Frank Stuart Irwin (born 27 June 1942 in Wandsworth, London) is a British former racing driver.  He participated in 10 Formula One World Championship Grands Prix, debuting on 16 July 1966.  He scored two championship points.

Irwin's career was ended prematurely by an accident he sustained when driving a Ford P68 sports prototype during practice for the 1968 1000km Nürburgring endurance race. He lost control of the notoriously twitchy car at the Flugplatz, the P68 flipping end over end after landing on its tail following a jump. He suffered severe head injuries but eventually recovered. However, it prevented him from racing again.

Irwin is still alive and reasonably well, but his whereabouts are largely unknown as he stays out of the public eye and away from motor racing events. In 2006 it was reported that he had become re-acquainted with a racing rival from the 1960s after a chance meeting in London, and that he sometimes still suffers flashbacks to his accident. Irwin was reported, however, to be in generally good condition.

In a rare appearance at a race meeting, Irwin attended the Thruxton Circuit's 40th anniversary celebrations in April 2008. A three-quarter page interview and a current photograph of him posing with old 1960s rivals and a Formula 2 car appeared in the June 2008 issue of Motor Sport magazine. He is currently living in rural Rutland in the UK.

Racing record

Complete British Saloon Car Championship results
(key) (Races in bold indicate pole position; races in italics indicate fastest lap.)

Complete Formula One World Championship results
(key)

Non-Championship Formula One results
(key) (Races in bold indicate pole position)
(Races in italics indicate fastest lap)

Complete Tasman Series results

Complete European Formula Two Championship results

References

Sources
Profile at www.grandprix.com

1942 births
24 Hours of Le Mans drivers
British Formula Three Championship drivers
English racing drivers
English Formula One drivers
European Formula Two Championship drivers
People with traumatic brain injuries
Living people
Tasman Series drivers
Brabham Formula One drivers
Reg Parnell Racing Formula One drivers
World Sportscar Championship drivers